VfL Kirchheim Knights is a professional basketball club based in Kirchheim unter Teck, Germany. The team plays in the ProA, the second highest stage in Germany.

Season by season

Source: Eurobasket

References

External links
Official site 

Basketball teams in Germany